James Armistead Lafayette (born 1748 or 1760 – died 1830 or 1832) was an enslaved African American who served the Continental Army during the American Revolutionary War under the Marquis de Lafayette, and later received a legislative emancipation. As a double agent, he reported the activities of Benedict Arnold after he had defected to the British, and of Lord Charles Cornwallis during the run-up to the siege of Yorktown. He fed the British false information while disclosing very accurate and detailed accounts to the Americans.

Early life 
James was born to an enslaved mother either in North Carolina or Virginia. He became the property of Colonel John Armistead of New Kent County, Virginia. Well before the Colonel's death in 1779 he became the first slave owned by and personal manservant of Armistead's son William. Most sources believe that he was born in 1748, though others put his birth around 1760. James' owner taught him to read and write.

American Revolution

His enslaver William Armistead was an ardent Patriot, and served as commissary for Virginia's troops in the Revolutionary War. After his father died in 1779, he inherited stores and land, as well as James (who never used "Armistead" as his surname during his lifetime). When the conflict began in 1775, Virginia's royal governor, Lord Dunmore, promised freedom to slaves who joined his forces. Instead, James volunteered for the Continental Army under General Lafayette. He worked for Lafayette as a courier, laborer, and spy. Posing as a runaway slave, James joined former Continental Army officer Benedict Arnold's camp in Portsmouth, Virginia ostensibly as a spy for the British. This role allowed Armistead to gain Arnold's confidence, in part by guiding British troops through local roads. "The ex-slave, who later renamed himself James Armistead Lafayette in the general's honor, served as a double agent against the British under the avowedly anti-slavery Lafayette."

After Arnold departed north in the spring of 1781, James remained in Virginia and continued his work at the camps of Lord Charles Cornwallis. Now employed by the British as a courier, James traveled between their camps and often overheard officers speak openly about their strategies. He prepared written reports, and delivered them to other American spies. In this way, he relayed much information about the British plans for troop deployment and their arms. His espionage was instrumental in helping American and French forces defeat the British during the siege of Yorktown.

Legislative emancipation 

Although Virginia enacted a manumission act in 1782 allowing for the freedom of any slave who had fought in the Revolutionary War, James Armistead remained the property of William Armistead. This was because the next year (1783) another law specifically freed only slaves who had been issued firearms (i.e. whose owners had used them as substitutes for army service). James had served as a spy, not a soldier, and did not carry a gun. Thus his first petition for emancipation was not passed even by a legislative committee before the session ended. However, James persisted and succeeded with the support of William Armistead – again in 1786 a member of the House of Delegates – and Lafayette's personal 1784 testimonial as to James's service. On January 9, 1787, Virginia's governor signed James’s petition, which both houses of the assembly had passed. Virginia later compensated Armistead for James' manumission. Upon receiving his freedom, James added "Lafayette" (or "Fayette") as his surname to honor the French general.

Later life 

James Lafayette acquired two parcels totaling about forty acres in New Kent County in 1816 and became a relatively wealthy farmer in the area. In addition to his (second) wife and several children (including a son), he bought three slaves to work his land.  In 1818, Lafayette applied to Virginia's legislature for a pension based on his Revolutionary War service. He eventually received $60 for present relief and a $40 annual pension, which he traveled to Richmond to collect twice a year thereafter.

In 1824, the Marquis de Lafayette returned to the United States at the invitation of President James Monroe. He made a tour of all 24 states, during which huge crowds gathered to see him and he was feted as a hero. Lafayette visited Yorktown, as well as George Washington's grave at Mount Vernon and also gave a speech to the Virginia General Assembly in Richmond. While in Richmond, he abruptly ordered his carriage stopped when he saw James in the crowd, and rushed to embrace him.

Death and legacy
Sources differ as to whether James A. Lafayette died in Baltimore or New Kent County in 1830 (the year he picked up his last pension payment), or in Virginia in 1832. 

During his lifetime, James's heroism was mentioned in a two-volume book of historical fiction by James E. Heath,Edge Hill: or the Family of the Fitz Royals.(1828) The French artist Jean-Baptiste Le Paon included a black servant in French livery in a portrait he painted of the Marquis de LaFayette in 1785, which some think was intended to represent this man. John Blennerhassett Martin painted his portrait about the time of Heath's book, and distributed copies with the Marquis de LaFayette's testimony concerning his service. Some believe a figure of James Lafayette may be on the Lafayette memorial dedicated in Prospect Park, in Brooklyn, New York in 1917. In 1997, Virginia erected a highway marker on the grounds of the historic New Kent County courthouse to recognize his service.

See also 

 Intelligence in the American Revolutionary War
 Benjamin Tallmadge
 Liberty's Kids, episode 35

References

Further reading

External links 

18th-century births
1830s deaths
American spies during the American Revolution
British spies during the American Revolution
Double agents
Gilbert du Motier, Marquis de Lafayette
People of Virginia in the American Revolution
People from New Kent County, Virginia
Black Patriots